Cinemateca do Museu de Arte Moderna is a film archive located in Brazil. Its collection comprises 80,000 film reels and a 10,000 volumes library. It was founded in 1948.

See also 
 List of film archives
 Cinema of Brazil

References

External links 
 https://mam.rio/cinemateca/ (In Portuguese)

Archives in Brazil
Film archives in South America